Grandville is a city in Kent County in the U.S. state of Michigan. The population was 15,378 at the 2010 census.

Grandville is just southwest of the city of Grand Rapids and is part of the Grand Rapids metropolitan area.  It was first settled in 1833 and later incorporated as a city in 1933.

History

Settlement
Anishinaabe peoples are indigenous to the Grand Rapids metropolitan area. Grandville was geographically an important place during the logging years in Michigan's history due to its location at the "river-bend" of the Grand River. It was important to have people there to make sure the logs did not jam up as the river turned north-west toward Grand Haven.

Grandville was founded in 1833 and incorporated as a city in 1933.

Recent history
By the 1980s due to the growth of the Grand Rapids metropolitan area following the early 1980s recession in the United States, Grandville began to experience even more growth. In 1987, color measurement and manufacturer X-Rite established its headquarters in the city a year after it went public, soon becoming one of the fastest growing businesses in Michigan.

In the 1990s, the city was being eyed for larger development. In 1990, developers had begun eyeing a development of a new mall near the intersection of 44th Street and Ivanrest and met with the city for approval. In 1999, construction of RiverTown Crossings, a mall with 1.25 million in storefronts, was finally completed.

Into the 2000s, Grandville experienced continued growth following the opening of Rivertown Crossings. Multiple restaurants and strip malls developed on Rivertown Parkway following the mall's construction. However, by the beginning of the Great Recession, X-Rite had moved its headquarters nearby to Kentwood in 2007.

A new fire station was constructed across the street from city hall at Prairie and Wilson in 2000 to make way for a new police station and hall of justice in 2003 next to city hall and a Kent District Library on Wilson Avenue.

One of the city's largest employers is the Rivertown Crossings Mall. In 2013, two stores, Cabela's and Target, became anchors to a development on the previous Xrite site across from Rivertown Crossings.  Following the recession into the 2010s, more development occurred in the city with a Cabela's and Target anchoring a development on the former X-Rite property in 2013. In 2016, a new apartment development called the Grand Castle that incorporated over 1 million square feet and 400 apartments into its design was constructed.

Geography

The Grand River forms the northern border of the city, and the city of Grand Rapids is just to the northeast, while Walker is to the north and Wyoming surrounds the city on the east and south.  Ottawa County is to the west.

Major highways
 run through Grandville near the north and west portions of the city.
 runs west–east through the northern portion of the city.
 has its western terminus at I-196 at the western border of the city.

Demographics

2010 census
As of the census of 2010, there were 15,378 people, 5,982 households, and 4,160 families residing in the city.

The racial makeup of the city was 92.0% White, 2.2% African American, 0.2% Native American, 1.5% Asian, 1.8% from other races, and 2.4% from two or more races. Hispanic or Latino of any race were 6.2% of the population. There were 5,982 households, of which 33.5% had children under the age of 18 living with them, 54.5% were married couples living together, 11.0% had a female householder with no husband present, 4.1% had a male householder with no wife present, and 30.5% were non-families. 24.9% of all households were made up of individuals, and 10.2% had someone living alone who was 65 years of age or older. The average household size was 2.54 and the average family size was 3.06.

The median age in the city was 36.3 years. 24.8% of residents were under the age of 18; 9.7% were between the ages of 18 and 24; 25.3% were from 25 to 44; 25.6% were from 45 to 64; and 14.6% were 65 years of age or older. The gender makeup of the city was 48.3% male and 51.7% female.

2000 census
At the 2000 census, there were 16,263 people, 6,095 households, and 4,370 families residing in the city. The racial makeup of the city was 94.94% White, 1.40% African American, 0.26% Native American, 1.16% Asian, 0.02% Pacific Islander, 0.87% from other races, and 1.34% from two or more races. Hispanic or Latino of any race were 3.08% of the population.

There were 6,095 households, out of which 37.0% had children under the age of 18 living with them, 58.9% were married couples living together, 9.8% had a female householder with no husband present, and 28.3% were non-families. 22.8% of all households were made up of individuals, and 8.4% had someone living alone who was 65 years of age or older.  The average household size was 2.64 and the average family size was 3.13.

In the city the population was spread out, with 27.9% under the age of 18, 10.6% from 18 to 24, 28.0% from 25 to 44, 20.8% from 45 to 64, and 12.8% who were 65 years of age or older.  The median age was 34 years. For every 100 females there were 94.7 males.  For every 100 females age 18 and over, there were 90.2 males.

The median income for a household in the city was $47,570, and the median income for a family was $55,047. Males had a median income of $41,619 versus $26,350 for females. The per capita income for the city was $21,306.  About 3.2% of families and 4.5% of the population were below the poverty line, including 3.7% of those under age 18 and 4.2% of those age 65 or over.

Government
Grandville operates under a council-manager form of government.  Ken Krombeen, the city manager, is appointed by the city council to act as the executive of the city, overseeing all departments.   The council is composed of six members and a mayor, all elected at large.  The Mayor holds a largely ceremonial role, having no veto authority. Three members of the council are elected every two years.

Currently, seven men serve on the city council.  Carol Pettijohn, the mayor pro-tem, longest serving council member, and only woman on the council, retired in 2019.  Business manager J.R. Vanderwall was appointed to fill her vacancy.  Business owner Steve Maas currently serves as the mayor of the city, having replaced long time mayor Jim Buck in 2013.

In 2019, Tim Steenstra, retired Director of Grandville Christian Schools, joined his son, Andy, a sales manager, on the council.  The two served as the city council's first father-son duo in the history of the city. The younger Steenstra did not seek re-election in 2021, and was replaced by former Councilmember Randy Gelderloos, who was re-elected after having lost re-election in 2019.  Former Senator Carl Levin's constituent liaison Paul Troost, teacher Justin Noordhoek, and registered nurse Josh Meringa form the remainder of the council.

Notable people
 David Agema, Michigan state representative
 Devin Booker, NBA player for the Phoenix Suns
 Allyssa DeHaan, collegiate basketball player
 Brent Gates, professional baseball player
 Hai Du Lam, professional League of Legends player
 Terri Lynn Land, former Michigan Secretary of State
 Buster Mathis Jr., professional boxer
 Benny McCoy, professional baseball player

References

External links

Grandville official website

Cities in Kent County, Michigan
Grand Rapids metropolitan area
1833 establishments in Michigan Territory
Populated places established in 1833